Big Bear High School is a high school in Big Bear City, California. It is the only conventional high school in the Bear Valley Unified School District. It was established as an institution in 1948 but has since moved to a new building.

Athletics
Big Bear High School offers programs such as Football, Baseball, Basketball (Boys and Girls), Volleyball, Softball, Wrestling, Golf, Tennis, Cross Country, and Soccer. Big Bear High is associated with the CIF program. Big Bear High fields a very competitive cross country team and football team for their division. The football team won the C.I.F championships in 1992,2006, and 2017.  The school also has had C.I.F championships for Baseball in 1993, and Softball in 1988. However, the team with the most success is the boys' cross country team. They finished 2nd in the state in 2005 and 2009, and won the California state championship 3 years in a row from 2006-2008. The girls cross country team also achieved a 3rd-place finish at the state championships in 2013.  The team has also had three boys finish individually in the Top 3 at the National Championships held each December.

Notable alumni
Ryan Hall Olympian, fastest American-born marathoner in history
Jordan Romero, the youngest person ever to climb Mount Everest and the Seven Summits, the highest point on all seven continents

References

High schools in San Bernardino County, California
Big Bear Valley
Public high schools in California
1948 establishments in California